Ethel Teare (January 11, 1894 – March 4, 1959) was an American silent film actress from Phoenix, Arizona.

Screen comedian

Her first film appearances came in 1914. She performed in The Widow's Might, Fatty and the Shyster Lawyer, Tough Luck Smith, The Devil and Mrs. Walker, In Dutch, Through The Keyhole, and Love, Oil and Grease.

Teare acted in Mack Sennett comedies during World War I.  In Desperate Bud, the Plumber, a Kalem Company comedy, Teare was supported by Charles Dudley in the title role. Some Romance, also produced by Kalem, featured Teare and her mastiff. Kalem was a forerunner of Universal Pictures in Hollywood. These Ham and Bud comedies were directed by Sennett.

She also starred in films of her own for Kalem; then she went on team with Mack Swain in Kalem productions, beginning with Thirst (1917).

Teare continued in motion pictures until the mid-1920s. One of her final roles was in Antony and Cleopatra (1924), a comedy short directed by Bryan Foy. Other roles of note include Hold Me Tight (1920), Skirts (1921), Please Be Careful (1922), Columbus and Isabella (1924), and A Woman Who Sinned (1924).

Personal life

 
Teare married Frank F. Risso, an assistant to the president of Bank of America.  She was a member of the Vittoria Colonna Club of San Francisco, California.

Death

On March 4, 1959, Teare died at Mills Hospital in San Mateo, California, following a long illness. She was 65. She had resided in San Mateo since 1925. She was entombed in Holy Cross Cemetery in Colma, California.

Filmography
The Widow's Might
Fatty and the Shyster Lawyer
Tough Luck Smith
The Devil and Mrs. Walker
In Dutch
Through The Keyhole
Love, Oil and Grease
Thirst (1917)
Her First Kiss (1919)

Her Naughty Wink (1920)
Hold Me Tight (1920)
Skirts (1921)
Please Be Careful (1922)
Columbus and Isabella (1924)
A Woman Who Sinned (1924)
Antony and Cleopatra (1924), a comedy short directed by Bryan Foy

References
 
 
Lima Daily News, Ethel Teare, April 27, 1915, Page 16.
Long Beach Press-Telegram, Actress of Silent Screen Days Dies, Thursday, March 5, 1959, Page A8.
San Mateo Times, Ethel Risso Dies Here, March 4, 1959, Page 5.

External links

 

1894 births
1959 deaths
20th-century American actresses
Actresses from Phoenix, Arizona
American silent film actresses
Burials at Holy Cross Cemetery (Colma, California)